Michigan Avenue station is a Detroit People Mover station in Downtown Detroit, Michigan.  It is located at the corner of Michigan and Cass Avenues.  The station takes its name from nearby Michigan Avenue (where it intersects). This station, like Times Square serves the new Rosa Parks Transit Center. The former Tiger Stadium site, on Michigan & Trumbull, is also accessible from this station, approximately 1 mile to the west.

See also

 List of rapid transit systems
 List of United States rapid transit systems by ridership
 Transportation in metropolitan Detroit

References

External links
 DPM station overview
Michigan Avenue entrance from Google Maps Street View

Detroit People Mover stations
Railway stations in the United States opened in 1987
1987 establishments in Michigan